Rahul Kannoly Praveen (born 16 March 2000) commonly known as Rahul. K. P, is an Indian professional footballer who plays as a winger or forward for Indian Super League club Kerala Blasters and the India national team.

Club career

Youth and early career
Born in Thrissur, Kerala, Rahul played for the Thrissur district under-14 football team and later went on to play for the Kerala football team in the same age group. He was the top goalscorer in the under-14 category of the national championship held at Kolkata in 2013. On seeing his performance in the championship he was selected into the AIFF Elite Academy who was preparing for the 2017 FIFA U-17 World Cup to be hosted in India. After playing in the tournament, Rahul was selected to play for the Indian Arrows, an All India Football Federation-owned team that would consist of U-20 players to give them playing time. He made his professional debut for the side in the Arrow's first match of the season against Chennai City. He started and played the whole match as Indian Arrows won 3–0.

A month later, on 26 December, Rahul scored his first professional goal against Shillong Lajong. His 91st-minute goal was the last for the Arrows in a 3–0 victory. He then scored again for the club in their next match against Mohun Bagan on 29 December. This time, his 33rd-minute goal was the equalizer as the Indian Arrows drew the match 1–1. 
He became the first Indian player to score in Indian Super Cup 2019 by scoring against Mumbai City FC during the qualification round.

Kerala Blasters: 2019–present

On 19 March 2019, he signed for Indian Super League club Kerala Blasters. He made his debut on October 24, 2019, coming off the bench in the 54th minute as Kerala lost 1–0 to Mumbai City. On November 22 he scored his first competitive goal for the club in the 34th minute of the match against Hyderabad from the assist of Sahal as Kerala blasters lost 2-1 and became the second youngest goalscorer for the club after Deependra Negi. Even though he was ruled out in most matches due to injury, Rahul made a total of eight appearances during the season.

In September 2020, Rahul extended his contract with the Blasters until 2025. On 13 December, he scored his first goal of the 2020-21 season in the South Indian Derby against Bengaluru. Rahul once again scored against Bengaluru FC on 20 January 2021. He scored the crucial winner in the 94th minute of the game, sealing the victory for Blasters.

In 2021, he was named in the Kerala Blasters squad for 2021 Durand Cup, where he played all three matches for the club in the tournament. Rahul played his first match of the 2021–22 Indian Super League season on 19 November in the season opener against ATK Mohun Bagan and assisted for the goal scored by Sahal Abdul Samad, before being substituted due to an injury. The Blasters later confirmed that Rahul had suffered a partial tear on the groin muscle and would be out of action for minimum four weeks. He came back to pitch in the match against Hyderabad on 23 February 2022, where he assisted to the only goal scored by the Blasters in their 2–1 defeat over the Nizams. Rahul scored his first goal of the season in the final match of the 2021–22 ISL season against Hyderabad on 20 March, where his goal gave the lead for the Blasters initially, but the Blasters lost in penalty shoot-out after Hyderabad equalized in the last moments of the regular 90 minutes.

On 25 November 2022, Rahul assisted Sahal for a goal in the 85th minute in a 3–0 away win against NorthEast United FC and won the Hero of the Match Award. He scored his first goal of the season against ATK Mohun Bagan on 16 October, where he scored a long-range goal in the 81st minute, but the Blasters lost the match 2–5 at full-time. His second goal of the season was the winner against Chennaiyin FC on 7 February 2023, which the Blasters won 2–1 after Rahul's goal helped the Blasters to secure a comeback in the Southern Derby. Rahul was sent-off after receiving a second yellow against ATK Mohun Bagan in the returning fixture on 18 February, as the Blasters lost the match by a score of 2–1.

International career

Youth
Rahul represented the India under-17 team which participated in the 2017 FIFA U-17 World Cup for which India was the host nation. He made his debut in the U-17 World Cup on 6 October 2022 in a 3–0 loss against United States. Rahul later went on to play for the India under-20 team and the India under-23 team.

Senior
On 20 September 2022, Rahul was named in India's squad for the Hung Tinh Friendly football tournament in Vietnam. He made his first senior appearance for India on 24 September 2022 in a 1–1 draw against Singapore by coming as a substitute for Ashique Kuruniyan in the 68th minute.

Personal life
In May 2021, Rahul was signed as the first ever South-Indian brand ambassador of MyFitness, India's first U.S.FDA Registered Peanut Butter brand.

Style of play
Rahul primarily plays as a right-winger and can be also deployed as a left-winger. He is naturally right-footed and is known for his speed, explosiveness, dribbling and work rate. Rahul has also been deployed as a striker on several games.

Career statistics

Club statistics

International statistics

Honours

Club

Kerala Blasters FC 

 Indian Super League runner-up: 2021–22.

References

External links 

 
 Rahul Kannoly Praveen at Indian Super League
 Rahul Kannoly Praveen at All India Football Federation

2000 births
Living people
Footballers from Thrissur
Indian footballers
AIFF Elite Academy players
Indian Arrows players
Association football goalkeepers
I-League players
India youth international footballers
Kerala Blasters FC players
Indian Super League players
India international footballers